The Federal Reserve Bank of San Francisco, Portland Branch, was a branch of the Federal Reserve Bank of San Francisco. The branch closed in 2005 and its operations were absorbed by the Seattle Branch. The Portland location is now a depot site for the storage and transfer of cash.
The branch was located in Portland, Oregon, at 907 SW Stark St. The depot is located at 1500 SW First Avenue.

See also

 Federal Reserve Act
 Federal Reserve System
 Federal Reserve Bank
 Federal Reserve Districts
 Federal Reserve Branches
 Federal Reserve Bank of San Francisco
 Federal Reserve Bank of San Francisco Los Angeles Branch
 Federal Reserve Bank of San Francisco Salt Lake City Branch
 Federal Reserve Bank of San Francisco Seattle Branch
 Federal Reserve Bank of San Francisco Building (San Francisco, California)
 Structure of the Federal Reserve System

References

Federal Reserve branches
Banks based in Oregon
Organizations based in Portland, Oregon